Kliton Bozgo (born 5 December 1971) is a retired Albanian footballer.

Playing career

Club
During his career he played for both Slovenian football giants Olimpija and Maribor. He made a big impact in 1. SNL, especially in Maribor, where he is still regarded as one of the best forwards to ever play for the club. Overall, he scored a total of 110 goals for the Violets.

He was the best scorer of Slovenian League twice. This was in the 1999–2000 season (24 goals) and in the 2004–05 season (18 goals). In the 1999–2000 season he also played for Maribor in the elite UEFA Champions League. In total he has played 207 matches in Slovenian first league, scoring 109 goals in the process.

International
He made his debut for Albania in a February 1993 FIFA World Cup qualification match against Northern Ireland in Tirana and earned a total of 12 caps, scoring no goals. His final international was a February 2000 Malta International Football Tournament match against Malta.

Managerial career
During his time in Mura 05 he took the role of the assistant coach of Edin Osmanović. He joined Osmanović as assistant coach at Aluminij in 2013 upon his return from Austria, where he was player/manager of Union Gamlitz. After an unsuccessful fight for survival, Osmanović was replaced by Ante Šimundža before the start of the 2013–14 season in the second tier. Šimundža, a former teammate of Bozgo during the 1999–2000 season, quickly left Aluminij and took the reins at Maribor after they parted company with Ante Čačić, thus giving Bozgo a chance as interim manager in Kidričevo. But on 10 October Aluminij announced Robert Pevnik as Šimundža's successor and Bozgo stayed on as his assistant until the end of the season. After he left the club he returned to management with SV Sachsenburg in 2015 and in January 2016 he started a new chapter with SV Kaindorf in the Austrian Gebietsliga. He was replaced by Gernot Krinner in April 2018.

References

External links

Profile at Playerhistory 
Profile at PrvaLiga 

1971 births
Living people
Footballers from Gjirokastër
Association football forwards
Albanian footballers
Albania international footballers
FK Tomori Berat players
NK Dubrava players
NK Maribor players
NK Olimpija Ljubljana (1945–2005) players
FC Admira Wacker Mödling players
NK Drava Ptuj players
TSV Hartberg players
Wolfsberger AC players
ND Mura 05 players
Slovenian PrvaLiga players
Austrian Football Bundesliga players
Albanian expatriate footballers
Expatriate footballers in Croatia
Expatriate footballers in Slovenia
Expatriate footballers in Austria
Albanian expatriate sportspeople in Croatia
Albanian expatriate sportspeople in Slovenia
Albanian expatriate sportspeople in Austria
Albanian football managers
Albanian expatriate football managers
Expatriate football managers in Slovenia
Expatriate football managers in Austria